In 2008 the Southern 100 motorcycle races on the Isle of Man featured a Solo Championship race, won by the Welsh rider Ian Lougher on a 1000cc Yamaha.

Race 11; Solo Championship Race
Thursday 10 July 2008 – Billown Circuit 4 laps (Reduced Race Distance) – 17.00 miles (25.76 km)

Fastest Lap; Ian Lougher – 2 minutes 28.301 seconds 103.169 mph

External links

South
2008 in British motorsport
2008